The Tomahawk National Wildlife Refuge is located in the U.S. state of North Dakota and consists of 440 acres (1.78 km2). Tomahawk NWR is a privately owned easement refuge, managed with by the U.S. Fish and Wildlife Service. The refuge was established to protect habitat for migratory bird species, white-tail deer and other mammals. Valley City Wetland Management District oversees the refuge, which in turn is a part of the Arrowwood National Wildlife Refuge Complex. The refuge can be accessed from North Dakota Highway 1, and is one mile (1.6 km) east of the town of Rogers, North Dakota.

References

External links
  - includes Tomahawk National Wildlife Refuge
 

National Wildlife Refuges in North Dakota
Easement refuges in North Dakota
Protected areas of Barnes County, North Dakota